Lieutenant-General Sir Archibald Edward Nye,  (23 April 1895 – 13 November 1967) was a senior British Army officer who served in both world wars. In the latter he served as Vice-Chief of the Imperial General Staff (VCIGS).

After the Second World War he served as Governor of Madras, after which Nehru asked for him to stay on as High Commissioner in India. He subsequently served as High Commissioner to Canada.

Early life
Archibald Edward Nye was born on 23 April 1895 at Ship Street Barracks, Dublin, to Charles Edward Nye and Mary Sexton. He was the second of three sons born to the couple, who also had three daughters. His father was a regimental sergeant major in the Oxfordshire and Buckinghamshire Light Infantry, British Army.

Nye was educated at the Duke of York's Royal Military School, a boarding school for sons of non-commissioned officers, and desired to become a schoolmaster. But the First World War broke out at this juncture and Nye joined the Army.

Military career
At the outset of the Great War, Nye went to France with the British Expeditionary Force in 1914, serving for just over a year as a non-commissioned officer in the Corps of Army Schoolmasters attached to the Oxfordshire and Buckinghamshire Light Infantry. In 1915, as a sergeant, he was selected for a permanent commission in the Prince of Wales' Leinster Regiment, and was commissioned as a second lieutenant on 5 December 1915. 
He was further promoted to lieutenant on 5 September 1916, and to the acting rank of captain in August 1917. Wounded twice in action, he was awarded the Military Cross for bravery. The official citation for this ward reads:

When the Leinster Regiment was disbanded, Nye was transferred to the Royal Warwickshire Regiment. During the interwar period he had a number of regimental appointments. Promoted to captain on 20 June 1923, he attended the staff officer's course at the Staff College, Camberley in 1924–25 which he successfully completed. Following this, he served as a staff officer in Air Cooperation from 1926−28 before becoming a brigade major with the 33rd Infantry Brigade. Brevetted to major on 1 July 1930, he completed his graduation in law and qualified as a barrister at the Inner Temple in 1932. He was then posted as an instructor to the Staff College with the local rank of lieutenant-colonel, and advanced to brevet lieutenant-colonel on 1 July 1934. Nye was promoted to the substantive rank of major on 8 September 1935, and to the substantive rank of lieutenant-colonel in September 1937. From late 1937 to early 1939 he commanded the 2nd Battalion, Royal Warwickshire Regiment.

On 20 May 1939, Nye was promoted to colonel, with the temporary rank of brigadier, and sent to India to raise a brigade, commanding the Nowshera Brigade from May 1939 to January 1940. In February 1940 he returned to London to take up the post of deputy director of Staff Duties, War Office and became Director of Staff Duties with the acting rank of major-general from 1 November. Promoted to substantive major-general on 18 November 1941, in December he became Vice-Chief of the Imperial General  Staff  under Sir Alan Brooke with the acting rank of lieutenant-general from 5 December. The enormous burdens placed on Brooke meant that he needed to delegate many of his tasks and for this he relied heavily on Nye. The partnership was highly successful and Nye remained in the job for the rest of the war. It could be said that while Brooke ran the war, Nye ran the army. Advanced to the temporary rank of lieutenant-general on 5 December 1942, in the 1944 Birthday Honours Nye was knighted as a Knight Commander of the Order of the British Empire, the first of five knighthoods he would ultimately be conferred with. He was promoted to the substantive rank of lieutenant-general on 14 September 1944. Nye retired on 29 March 1946.

Later life
Following his retirement, Nye was appointed Governor of Madras on 26 February 1946, took charge on 5 May 1946 and served as Governor till 7 September 1948. The day prior to his appointment as Governor there was a major labour strike in Madras. The rest of his term was plagued by peasant uprisings all over the province. These rebellions were aided and abetted by the Communists who established miniature governments along the northern frontiers of the Presidency, thereby demanding military action. 

Nye attributed their success to the "zeal and energy of young men who conducted their own newspapers and who preached the creed of expropriating landlords and distributing their land to needy and hungry labourers". Nye was also the Colonel-in-chief of the Madras Regiment from 10 August 1946 to 31 March 1949. The Recruits Training Centre was moved from Madukkarai near Coimbatore to Wellington in February 1947. Nye inaugurated the Madras offices of the British Council in July–August 1948.

In November 1947, when Sir Frederick Gentle, the Chief Justice of the Madras High Court, resigned over the Government of India order that the Chief Minister of the particular state should be consulted along with the Union Home Minister with regard to the selection of High Court judges, Nye expressed support for Gentle against political interference in appointment of judges.

Nye presided over independence day celebrations in Madras city. On 15 August 1947, Nye was sworn-in by Chief Justice Gentle as the first Governor of Madras in the Dominion of India while O.P. Ramaswami Reddiar was sworn in as Premier. Nye unfurled the Indian tricolour at the Island Grounds.

Following his term in Madras, Nye was appointed the UK's High Commissioner to India, in which post he served from 1948 to 1952. He then served as the UK's High Commissioner to Canada from 1952 to 1956.

Family
In 1939, Nye married divorcee Una Sheila Colleen, daughter of Sir Harry Hugh Sidney Knox. The couple had one daughter.

In the 1960s and 1970s, Lady Nye was a member of Wiltshire County Council and was a member of its Education Committee.

Honours

Order of wear per current London Gazette regulations.

Knight Grand Commander of the Order of the Star of India (GCSI) (August 14, 1947) 
Knight Grand Cross of the Order of St. Michael and St. George (GCMG) (June 7, 1951) 
Knight Grand Commander of the Order of the Indian Empire (GCIE) (February 8, 1946) 
Knight Commander of the Order of the Bath, Military Division (KCB) (January 1, 1946) 
Knight Commander of the Order of the British Empire, Military Division (KBE) (June 1, 1944)
Military Cross (MC) (1918)

References

Bibliography

External links

British Army Officers 1939−1945
Generals of World War II
Duke of York's School – Archibald Edward Nye

|-

1895 births
1967 deaths
Prince of Wales's Leinster Regiment officers
Royal Warwickshire Fusiliers officers
South Lancashire Regiment officers
British Army personnel of World War I
British Army generals of World War II
Knights Grand Commander of the Order of the Star of India
Knights Grand Commander of the Order of the Indian Empire
Knights Grand Cross of the Order of St Michael and St George
Knights Commander of the Order of the Bath
Knights Commander of the Order of the British Empire
Recipients of the Military Cross
Governors of Tamil Nadu
High Commissioners of the United Kingdom to Canada
Graduates of the Staff College, Camberley
War Office personnel in World War II
Academics of the Staff College, Camberley
British Army lieutenant generals
Military personnel from Dublin (city)
People educated at the Duke of York's Royal Military School